Calumma is a genus of chameleons endemic and restricted to Madagascar. The species formerly named Calumma tigris was transferred to the genus Archaius by Townsend et al., when they found that it is more closely related to Rieppeleon than to Calumma. The oldest fossil of the genus (Calumma benovskyi) is known from the Early Miocene of Kenya, showing that the genus originated in Africa.

Species groups
Four species groups are recognised within the genus Calumma (originally proposed by Glaw & Vences in 1994), some of which may be only phenetic, while others are phylogenetically supported:

Calumma furcifer species group
Contents: Calumma furcifer, C. gastrotaenia, C. marojezense, C. guillaumeti, C. andringitraense, C. glawi, C. vencesi

Species characterised by typically green body colouration, sleek body form, and generally no occipital lobes (flaps of skin posterior to the head; present only in C. glawi) and no rostral appendage (present only in males of C. furcifer).

Calumma cucullatum species group
Contents: Calumma cucullatum, C. crypticum, C. amber, C. tsaratananense, C. hafahafa, C. hilleniusi, C. peltierorum, C. malthe, C. brevicorne, C. jejy, C. tsycorne

Species characterised by distinct occipital lobes and generally a single bony rostral appendage that is larger in males than females.

Calumma nasutum species group
Contents: Calumma nasutum, C. fallax, C. gallus, C. guibei, C. boettgeri, C. linotum, C. gehringi, C. uetzi, C. lefona, C. juliae, C. vatosoa, C. vohibola, C. peyrierasi, C. roaloko

Species characterised by a soft dermal rostral appendage (generally present in males and absent in females). The following members possess occipital lobes: C. guibei, C. boettgeri, C. linotum, C. gehringi, C. uetzi, C. lefona, C. roaloko, and C. juliae. These taxa are collectively referred to as the C. guibei species complex. Occipital lobes are absent from all other species. The assignment of C. peyrierasi to this group remains a subject of uncertainty.

Calumma parsonii species group
Contents: Calumma globifer, C. ambreense, C. oshaughnessyi, C. parsonii, C. capuroni

Species characterised by large body size, males with paired rostral appendages, and some species with small occipital lobes.

Species
The following 41 species are recognized as being valid as of October 2020:

Calumma amber  & Nussbaum, 2006 – Amber Mountain chameleon
Calumma ambreense (Ramanantsoa, 1974)
Calumma andringitraense ( C. Blanc & Domergue, 1972)
Calumma boettgeri (Boulenger, 1888) – Boettger's chameleon
Calumma brevicorne (Günther, 1879) – short-horned chameleon
Calumma capuroni (Brygoo, C. Blanc & Domergue, 1972) – Madagascar chameleon
Calumma crypticum Raxworthy & Nussbaum, 2006 – blue-legged chameleon
Calumma cucullatum (Gray, 1831) – hooded chameleon
Calumma emelinae Prötzel, Scherz, Ratsoavina, Vences, & Glaw, 2020 
Calumma fallax (Mocquard, 1900) – deceptive chameleon
Calumma furcifer (Vaillant & Grandidier, 1880) – forked chameleon
Calumma gallus (Günther, 1877) – blade chameleon
Calumma gastrotaenia (Boulenger, 1888) – Perinet chameleon
Calumma gehringi Prötzel, Vences, Scherz, Vieites & Glaw, 2017
Calumma glawi  1997 – Glaw's chameleon
Calumma globifer (Günther, 1879) – globe-horned chameleon or flat-casqued chameleon
Calumma guibei (Hillenius, 1959) – Guibe's chameleon
Calumma guillaumeti (Brygoo, C. Blanc & Domergue, 1974)
Calumma hafahafa Raxworthy & Nussbaum, 2006 – bizarre-nosed chameleon
Calumma hilleniusi (Brygoo, C. Blanc & Domergue, 1973)
Calumma jejy Raxworthy & Nussbaum, 2006 – Marojejy Peak chameleon
Calumma juliae Prötzel, Vences, Hawlitschek, Scherz, Ratsoavina & Glaw, 2018
Calumma lefona Prötzel, Vences, Hawlitschek, Scherz, Ratsoavina & Glaw, 2018
Calumma linotum (L. Müller, 1924) – Amber Mountain blue-nosed chameleon
Calumma malthe (Günther, 1879) – yellow-green chameleon
Calumma marojezense (Brygoo, C. Blanc & Domergue, 1970)
Calumma nasutum (A.M.C. Duméril & Bibron, 1836) – big-nosed chameleon, pimple-nose chameleon
Calumma oshaughnessyi (Günther, 1881) – O'Shaughnessy's chameleon
Calumma parsonii (Cuvier, 1824) – Parsons's chameleon
Calumma peltierorum Raxworthy & Nussbaum, 2006 – Peltier's chameleon
Calumma peyrierasi (Brygoo, C. Blanc & Domergue, 1974) –  chameleon, Peyriéras's chameleon
Calumma radamanus (Mertens, 1933)
Calumma ratnasariae Prötzel, Scherz, Ratsoavina, Vences & Glaw, 2020
Calumma roaloko Prötzel, Lambert, Andrianasolo, Hutter, Cobb, Scherz & Glaw, 2018 –  Two-toned soft-nosed chameleon
Calumma tarzan Gehring, Pabijan, Ratsoavina, J. Köhler, Vences & Glaw, 2010 – Tarzan chameleon, Tarzan's chameleon
Calumma tjiasmantoi Prötzel, Scherz, Ratsoavina, Vences, & Glaw, 2020
Calumma tsaratananense (Brygoo & Domergue, 1967) – Tsaratanana chameleon
Calumma tsycorne Raxworthy & Nussbaum, 2006 – blunt-nosed chameleon
Calumma uetzi Prötzel, Vences, Hawlitschek, Scherz, Ratsoavina & Glaw, 2018 – Uetz's soft-nosed chameleon
Calumma vatosoa  Mattioli, Jesu & Randrianirina, 2001
Calumma vencesi Andreone, Mattioli, Jesu & Randrianirina, 2001 – Vences's chameleon
Calumma vohibola Gehring, Ratsoavina, Vences & Glaw, 2011

Nota bene: A binomial authority in parentheses indicates that the species was originally described in a genus other than Calumma.

References

Further reading
Gray JE (1865). "Revision of the Genera and Species of Chamæleonidæ, with the Descriptions of some New Species". Proc. Zool. Soc. London 1864: 465–479. (Calumma, new genus, p. 476).

External links
Anderson CV (2006). Captive Chameleon Populations. Accessed 23-01-2009

 
Lizard genera
Taxa named by John Edward Gray